KJQS (1060 AM) was a radio station licensed to Van Buren, Arkansas, United States, serving the Ft. Smith, Arkansas, area. The station was owned by Cumulus Media.

For a time from 2006 to 2012, it broadcast a Regional Mexican format as La Maquina Musical 1060 (translates to The Musical Machine, possibly referring to a juke box). The station had been silent since March 23, 2012.

On November 30, 2015, KRUZ changed its call sign to KJQS. On December 8, 2015, Cumulus Media surrendered KJQS' license to the Federal Communications Commission (FCC); the FCC cancelled the license and deleted the KJQS call sign the same day.

External links

Regional Mexican radio stations in the United States
JQS
Cumulus Media radio stations
Defunct radio stations in the United States
Radio stations disestablished in 2015
2015 disestablishments in Arkansas
JQS
JQS
JQS
Van Buren, Arkansas